(Spanish for "Directorate General of Civil Aeronautics") may refer to:

Dirección General de Aeronáutica Civil (Bolivia)
Dirección General de Aeronáutica Civil (Chile)
Dirección General de Aeronáutica Civil (Guatemala)
Dirección General de Aeronáutica Civil (Honduras)
Dirección General de Aeronáutica Civil (Mexico)
Dirección General de Aeronáutica Civil (Paraguay)

See also
Dirección General de Aviación Civil (disambiguation)
Directorate General of Civil Aviation (disambiguation)